Emopamil is a calcium channel blocker and a high-affinity ligand of human sterol isomerase.

Structure 
Emopamil's structure consists of an organic amino compound, nitrile compound and a member of two benzene rings.

Applications 
Emopamil also known as EMP is a phenylalkylamine and inhibitor of 5-hydroxytryptamine 5-HT2 receptors. EMP includes a chiral quaternary carbon center, and research has indicated that its optical isomers have different biological effects. It interacts in an extracellular site of the nerve cell to inhibit calcium channel responses while other phenylalkylamines act at an intracellular site. The interaction site of emopamil suggests to its greater neuroprotective efficacy in research related to ischaemia.

See also
 EBP (gene)
 Voltage-dependent calcium channels
 Verapamil

References

Calcium channel blockers
Nitriles
Amines
Isopropyl compounds